The Four Noes and One Without, also known as the Four Noes was a pledge by former President of the Republic of China Chen Shui-bian made in his inauguration speech on 20 May 2000, concerning the political status of Taiwan.  It was an important part of cross-straits relations.

The pledge was that, provided the People's Republic of China has no intention to use military force against Taiwan, Chen's administration would not:
 declare Taiwanese independence,
 change the national title from "the Republic of China" to "the Republic of Taiwan",
 include the doctrine of special state-to-state relations in the Constitution of the Republic of China, or
 promote a referendum on unification or independence.
The above four pledges are called the "Four Noes".

In addition, the "One Without" was that Chen's administration would not abolish the National Unification Council (later abolished in 2006) or the National Unification Guidelines though during his administration the National Unification Council met only once. On February 27, 2006, the Council ceased to function in tandem with the elimination of its already meager budget. Chen said that his decision did not change the status quo in the Taiwan Strait, but instead returned sovereignty to the people of Taiwan.

The Four Noes and One Without were an important part of Republic of China-United States relations.  Several times, Chen had to reassure the United States that the Four Noes and One Without policy had not been abolished and that he was not attempting to circumvent the pledge via any loopholes.  The phrase that the United States used with regard to the policy of "Four Noes and One Without" was that the United States "appreciate[d] Chen's pledge and t[ook] it very seriously.

Policy revision

On 27 February 2006, Chen dismantled the National Unification Council and Guidelines saying they "will cease functioning and the budget no longer be appropriated", effectively breaking the promises made in 2000 if 'cease functioning' is considered to be synonymous with 'abolishing'. However, as the People's Republic of China has threatened to use military force against Taiwan by passing the Anti-Secession Law in March 2005 and continuing the buildup of missiles opposite the Taiwan Strait, the no intent of aggression provision may have long been violated. It is noteworthy that the 2004 referendum called by President Chen Shui-bian held in tandem with the presidential election used the 'emergent threat' stipulation in Taiwan's Referendum Law, thereby implying the provision had already been breached by China's imminent threat and missile buildup. Nevertheless, this move drew sharp rebuke from the United States, with the State Department insisting that the Taiwanese government clarify that the National Unification Council has not been abolished. However, in a TV interview days later, Chen stated that 'ceasing to function' is the same as having been 'abolished'.

In the week prior, he told U.S. Congressman Rob Simmons (R-CT) that the Council and Guidelines were "absurd products of an absurd era." Chen revealed he planned to draft a new constitution, which many conjectured would be pro-separatist, before he stepped down in 2008.

The Four Noes and One Without policy was officially replaced by Four Wants and One Without policy in 2007, which is essentially the opposite of the original Four Noes and One Without policy.

When Tsai Ing-wen became president in 2016, she announced what has been called a New Four Noes policy for her administration, namely no changes in its pledges, no changes in its goodwill, no bowing to pressure and no reversion to the old path of confrontation.

Criticism
Koo Kwang-ming and other pro-independence leaders openly criticized that Chen, as president, is "not constitutionally authorized" and has "no legal power" to confine Taiwanese political future and freedom with the pledge.  In addition, some of Chen's supporters such as Vice-president Annette Lu have suggested that the pledge may have loopholes such as the definition of military force. Furthermore, while the pledge stated that Chen would not support a referendum, some have suggested that it does not exclude the possibility of a referendum occurring by citizen initiative.  The possibility of loopholes has occasionally led to considerable unease in Beijing and in Washington, D.C.

Under strong objection from pro-independence leaders and his supporters, who threatened to walk out the inauguration ceremony immediately once the pledge was recited, Chen did not explicitly repeat this pledge in his 2004 inauguration speech after his re-election though he alluded to the pledge by stating that the assurances he had given in the 2000 inaugural address remained in effect, and he has stated many times that the pledge remains in effect.

See also
Three Noes
One Country on Each Side
Politics of the Republic of China
Taiwan–United States relations
Special non-state-to-state relations

References

Politics of Taiwan
Cross-Strait relations
2000 in Taiwan